The R597 road is a regional road in Ireland. It is a loop road from the N71 on the Haven Coast in west County Cork. The road forms part of the Wild Atlantic Way.

The R597 travels south from the N71 at Leap to the port village of Glandore. After Glandore, the road travels east and passes the megalithic Drombeg stone circle. It rejoins the N71 at the town of Rosscarbery.

References

Regional roads in the Republic of Ireland
Roads in County Cork